GCMA may refer to:

 Golf Club Managers' Association, a British professional organization
 Greenville County Museum of Art
 Groupement de Commandos Mixtes Aéroportés, a unit within the French counter-intelligence service active during the Cold War
 Global Certified Management Accountant
 Global Centre for Modern Ageing, a research and product development organisation with a living laboratory